Pope Benedict XVI declared 181 individuals venerable, based on the recognition of their heroic virtues from 2005 to 2013.

2005

December 19, 2005
Camilla Battista da Varano (1458–1524)
Carlo Bescapè (1550–1615)
Isabela de Rosis (1842–1911)
Joseph Kugler (1867–1946)
María Josefa Segovia Morón (1891–1957)
Massimo Rinaldi (1869–1941)
Paul Joseph Nardini (1821–1862)
Szymon of Lipnica (1435–1482)

2006

April 28, 2006
Caterina Coromina i Agustí (1824–1893)
Ciriaco María Sancha y Hervás (1833–1909)
Dolores Márquez Romero (1817–1904)
Esperança González i Puig (1823–1885)
Giuseppina Nicoli (1863–1924)
Luigia Poloni (1802–1855)
Margaretha Flesch (1826–1906)
Maria Matilde Bucchi (1812–1882)

June 26, 2006
Antonio Rosmini-Serbati (1797–1855)
Francesco Pianzola (1881–1943)
Hieronymus Jaegen (1841–1919)
Louise-Marguerite Claret de la Touche (1868–1915)
Marco Morelli (1834–1912)
Regina Lete Landa (1913–1941)
Wanda Malczewska (1822–1896)

November 15, 2006
Margherita Occhiena (1788–1856)

December 16, 2006
José Olallo Valdés (1820–1889)
Kaszap István (1916–1935)
Mamerto de la Ascensión Esquiú (1826–1883)
Salvatore Micalizzi (1856–1937)

2007

June 1, 2007
Alcide-Vital Lataste (1832–1869)
Armida Barelli (1882–1952)
Cleonilde Guerra (1922–1949)
Eleonore Margarete Weiss (1882–1923)
Francesco Maria Perez (1861–1937)
Giovanni Battista Arista (1863–1920)
Luigia Lavizzari (1867–1931)

July 6, 2007
Emilie Schneider (1820–1859)
Emmanuela Giovanna Scribano (1917–1968)
Hildegard Burjan (1883–1933)
Ignacia del Espíritu Santo (1663–1748)
Jérôme le Royer de la Dauversière (1597–1659)
Leopoldina Naudet (1773–1834)
Luca Passi (1789–1866)
Marcantonio Barbarigo (1640–1706)

December 17, 2007
Ana Marija Marović (1815–1887)
Antonietta Meo (1930–1937)
Francesco Mottola (1901–1969)
Manuel Lozano Garrido (1920–1971)
Maria Pierina (1890–1945)
Raphaël Rafiringa (1856–1919)
Serafino Morazzone (1747–1822)
Stephen Nehmé (1889–1938)

2008

March 15, 2008
Anna Osti (1895–1958
Aurelio Bacciarini (1873–1935)
Clement Vismara (1897–1988)
Eufemia Gemma Giannini (1884–1971)
Giocondo Pio Lorgna (1870–1928)
Joaquim Alves Brás (1889–1966)
Leopold of Alpandeire (1866–1956)
Luigia Mazzotta (1900–1922)
Margalida Amengual i Campaner (1888–1919)
Michaelangelo Longo (1812–1886)
Michael J. McGivney (1852–1890)
Paolo Roasenda (1906–1972)
Pietro Riminucci (1875–1960)
Victoriano Gondra Muruaga (1910–1974)

July 3, 2008
Chiara Badano (1971–1990)
Estephan El Douaihy (1630–1704)
Francisco Garmendia Mendizábal (1880–1969)
Giuseppe Dal Vago (1822–1895)
Giuseppe Di Donna (1901–1952)
Bárbara Maix (1818–1873)
Nuno Álvares Pereira (1360–1431)
Pius Keller (1825–1904)

November 12, 2008
Maria Troncatti (1883–1969)

December 6, 2008
Giacinto Bianchi (1835–1914)
Jan van den Boer (1841–1917)
Maria Clara of the Child Jesus (1843–1899)

December 22, 2008
Josep Tous Soler (1811–1871)

2009

January 17, 2009
Carolina Beltrami (1869–1932)
Juan de Palafox y Mendoza (1600–1659)
Lliberada Ferrarons i Vives (1803–1842)
María de la Purísima Salvat Romero (1926–1998)
Robert Spiske (1821–1888)

April 3, 2009
Benoîte Rencurel (1647–1718)
Felisa Pérez de Iriarte Casado (1904–1954)
Franz-Josef Rudigier (1811–1884)
Giacomo Gaglione (1896–1962)
Giuseppe Marcinò (1589–1655)
Irmã Dulce Pontes (1914–1992)
Johann Evangelist Wagner (1807–1886)
Manuela de Jesús Arias Espinosa (1904–1981)
Marie de La Ferre (1590–1652)
Teresa Candamo Álvarez-Calderon (1875–1953)

July 3, 2009
Anna Maria Janer Anglarill (1800–1885)
Clotilde Micheli (1849–1911)
Engelmar Unzeitig (1911–1945)
Teresa Manganiello (1849–1876)

December 19, 2009
Antonia Maria Verna (1773–1838)
Enrichetta Alfieri (1891–1951)
Francesca Farolfi (1853–1917)
Giunio Tinarelli (1912–1956)
Giuseppe Quadrio (1921–1963)
Jakov Varingez (1400–1496)
Louis Brisson (1817–1908)
Joan Mary Ward (1585–1645)
Pope Pius XII (1876–1958)
Pope John Paul II (1920–2005)

2010

March 27, 2010
Amalia Streitel (1844–1911)
Francesco Antonio Marcucci (1717–1798)
Henriette DeLille (1813–1862)
Luigi Novarese (1914–1984)
Janez Frančišek Gnidovec (1873–1939)
María Guggiari Echeverría (1925–1959)
Maria Theresia Bonzel (1830–1905)

July 1, 2010
Basilio Martinelli (1872–1962
Gertrude Prosperi (1799–1847)
Lucia Cavallo (1913–1947)
Maria del Carmen Albarracín Pascual (1927–1946)
Maria Kaupas (1880–1940)
María Antonia de Paz y Figueroa (1730–1799)

December 10, 2010
Antonio Palladino (1881–1926)
Maria Elisa Andreoli (1861–1935)
María Pilar Solsona Lambán (1881–1966)
Selim Abu Mrad (1853–1930)

2011

January 14, 2011
Antonio Franco (1585–1626)
Faustino Pérez-Manglano (1946–1963)
Francisca de Paula de Jesus (1810–1895)
Franziskus Maria Jordan (1848–1918)
Nelson Baker (1842–1936)

April 2, 2011
Adolphe Chatillon (1871–1929)
Bernhard Lehner (1930–1944)
Irene Stefani (1891–1930)
Libera Italia Maria Inglese (1866–1929)
Thomas Kurialacherry (1873–1925)
Vincenza Damato (1909–1948)

June 27, 2011
Francesco Marinoni (1490–1562)
José María García Lahiguera (1903–1989)
Laura Meozzi (1873–1951)
Luigia Tincani (1889–1976)
Matthew Kadalikattil (1872–1935)
Raffaele Dimiccoli (1887–1956)
Zeinab Alif (1845–1926)
Zofia Czeska (1584–1650)

December 19, 2011
Assunta Marchetti (1871–1948)
Donato Giannotti (1828–1914)
Élisabeth Eppinger (1814–1867)
Małgorzata Szewczyk (1828–1905)
Maria Julitta Ritz (1882–1966)
Marianna Amico Roxas (1883–1947)
Marie-Eugène de l'Enfant-Jésus (1894–1967)

2012

March 14, 2012
Félix Varela (1788–1853)

May 10, 2012
Baltasár Pardal Vidal (1886–1963)
Emilie Engel (1893–1955)
Frederic Baraga (1797–1868)
Jacques Sevin (1882–1951)
María Josefa Recio (1846–1883)
Maria Bolognesi (1924–1980)
Francisco de Paula Victor (1827–1905)
Pasquale Uva (1883–1955)
Rachelina Ambrosini (1925–1941)
Raffaello Delle Nocche (1877–1960)
Teresa Demjanovich (1901–1927)

June 28, 2012
Álvaro del Portillo (1914–1994)
Bogner Etelka (1905–1933)
Cristobal of Saint Catherine (1638–1690)
Fernanda Riva (1920–1956)
Fulton Sheen (1895–1979)
Louis Tijssen (1865–1929)
Marie-Josephte Fitzbach (1806–1885)
Mary Angeline Teresa McCrory (1893–1984)
Sisto Riario Sforza (1810–1877)

December 20, 2012
Claudia Russo (1889–1964)
Francesco Saverio Petagna (1812–1878)
Giovannina Franks (1807–1872)
Joaquina Maria Mercedes Barcelo Pages (1857–1940)
Juan José Jaime Bonal Cortada (1769–1829)
Louis-Marie Baudouin (1765–1835)
Ludwika Szczęsna (1863–1916)
Luisa Aveledo (1874–1959)
Pope Paul VI (1897–1978)
Rosa Elena Cornejo Pazmiño (1874–1964)

See also
 List of people declared venerable by Pope John XXIII
 List of people declared venerable by Pope Paul VI
 List of people declared venerable by Pope John Paul II
 List of people declared venerable by Pope Francis

External links
Hagiography Circle
Patron Saints Index

 
Venerable by Pope Benedict XVI